Sir John Tresidder Sheppard, MBE  ( – ) was an eminent classicist and the first non-Etonian to become the provost of King's College, Cambridge.

Early life
John Sheppard was educated at Dulwich College. He went up to King's College, Cambridge, where he studied Classics and won the Porson Prize.

Career
He was a lecturer in classics at King's College of Cambridge University from 1908 to 1933 and was provost from 1933 to 1954. During the Second World War he performed intelligence work, for which he was appointed MBE; he was knighted in 1950 for his services to Greek.  During his long career he translated many famous Greek classics, and published several books on the subject, including The Pattern of the Iliad, Greek Tragedy, and Aeschylus & Sophocles: Their Work and Influence.

Personal life
John Sheppard was openly homosexual. He was knighted in the 1950 King's Birthday Honours List.

References

External links
 

1881 births
1968 deaths
20th-century English male writers
Alumni of King's College, Cambridge
English classical scholars
Knights Bachelor
Members of the Order of the British Empire
People educated at Dulwich College
Provosts of King's College, Cambridge
Presidents of the Cambridge Union
British gay writers
Gay academics